The Codés Range (Kodesko mendilerroa in Basque and Sierra de Codés in Spanish) is a mountain range of western Navarre, Spain, part of the Basque Mountains. Its highest point is the 1,418-metre-high Ioar, located between Santa Cruz de Campezo and Aguilar de Codés. The Codés Range is the westernmost mountain range in Navarre, located right at the limit of Álava Province.

The Santuario de Nuestra Señora de Codés is located in this mountain range, within the Torralba del Río municipal term.

Together with the neighboring Andia and Urbasa ranges further north, Codés summits are usually covered in snow in the winter.

Summits
 Ioar, 1,418 m
 Kodes, 1,414 m
 Grudo, 1,363 m
 Laplana, 1,337 m
 Peña Blanca, 1,249 m
 San Cristobal, 1,245 m
 Costalera, 1,234 m
 Peña Redonda, 1,207 m
 Peña Gallet, 1,158 m
 Humada, 1,155 m
 Malpica, 1,087 m
 La Corolla, 1,072 metro

References

Sanz de Acedo, Alicia; Ganuza Chasco, Rufo, Sierras de Urbasa, Andía, Lokiz y Codés, . Editorial El Senderista.

External links

Mountain Walking
Urbasa-Andia Natural Park
Reaching Ioar from Campezo
Adolfo Eraso, Karst en Yeso del Diapiro de Estella

Basque Mountains
Mountain ranges of Navarre